Ölmez is a Turkish surname. Notable people with the surname include:

 Ali Ölmez (born 1983), Turkish footballer
 Cahit Ölmez (born 1963), Dutch actor
 Orhan Ölmez (born 1978), Turkish singer, composer, and songwriter

Turkish-language surnames